Recreational mathematics is mathematics carried out for recreation (entertainment) rather than as a strictly research and application-based professional activity or as a part of a student's formal education. Although it is not necessarily limited to being an endeavor for amateurs, many topics in this field require no knowledge of advanced mathematics. Recreational mathematics involves mathematical puzzles and games, often appealing to children and untrained adults, inspiring their further study of the subject.

The Mathematical Association of America (MAA) includes recreational mathematics as one of its seventeen Special Interest Groups, commenting:

Mathematical competitions (such as those sponsored by mathematical associations) are also categorized under recreational mathematics.

Topics 

Some of the more well-known topics in recreational mathematics are Rubik's Cubes, magic squares, fractals, logic puzzles and mathematical chess problems, but this area of mathematics includes the aesthetics and culture of mathematics, peculiar or amusing stories and coincidences about mathematics, and the personal lives of mathematicians.

Mathematical games
Mathematical games are multiplayer games whose rules, strategies, and outcomes can be studied and explained using mathematics. The players of the game may not need to use explicit mathematics in order to play mathematical games. For example, Mancala is studied in the mathematical field of combinatorial game theory, but no mathematics is necessary in order to play it.

Mathematical puzzles
Mathematical puzzles require mathematics in order to solve them. They have specific rules, as do multiplayer games, but mathematical puzzles do not usually involve competition between two or more players. Instead, in order to solve such a puzzle, the solver must find a solution that satisfies the given conditions.

Logic puzzles and classical ciphers are common examples of mathematical puzzles. Cellular automata and fractals are also considered mathematical puzzles, even though the solver only interacts with them by providing a set of initial conditions.

As they often include or require game-like features or thinking, mathematical puzzles are sometimes also called mathematical games.

Mathemagics 
Magic tricks based on mathematical principles can produce self-working but surprising effects. For instance, a mathemagician might use the combinatorial properties of a deck of playing cards to guess a volunteer's selected card, or Hamming codes to identify whether a volunteer is lying.

Other activities
Other curiosities and pastimes of non-trivial mathematical interest include:
 patterns in juggling
 the sometimes profound algorithmic and geometrical characteristics of origami
 patterns and process in creating string figures such as Cat's cradles, etc.
 fractal-generating software

Online blogs, podcasts, and YouTube channels

There are many blogs and audio or video series devoted to recreational mathematics.  Among the notable are the following:
 Cut-the-knot by Alexander Bogomolny
 Futility Closet by Greg Ross
 Numberphile by Brady Haran 
 Mathologer by Burkard Polster
 3Blue1Brown by Grant Sanderson
 The videos of Vi Hart
 Stand-Up Maths by Matt Parker

Publications

 The journal Eureka published by the mathematical society of the University of Cambridge is one of the oldest publications in recreational mathematics. It has been published 60 times since 1939 and authors have included many famous mathematicians and scientists such as Martin Gardner, John Conway, Roger Penrose, Ian Stewart, Timothy Gowers, Stephen Hawking and Paul Dirac.
 The Journal of Recreational Mathematics was the largest publication on this topic from its founding in 1968 until 2014 when it ceased publication.
 Mathematical Games (1956 to 1981) was the title of a long-running Scientific American column on recreational mathematics by Martin Gardner.  He inspired several generations of mathematicians and scientists through his interest in mathematical recreations. "Mathematical Games" was succeeded by 25 "Metamagical Themas" columns (1981-1983), a similarly distinguished, but shorter-running, column by Douglas Hofstadter, then by 78 "Mathematical Recreations" and "Computer Recreations" columns (1984 to 1991) by A. K. Dewdney, then by 96 "Mathematical Recreations" columns (1991 to 2001) by Ian Stewart, and most recently "Puzzling Adventures" by Dennis Shasha.
 The Recreational Mathematics Magazine, published by the Ludus Association, is electronic and semiannual, and focuses on results that provide amusing, witty but nonetheless original and scientifically profound mathematical nuggets. The issues are published in the exact moments of the equinox.

People 

Prominent practitioners and advocates of recreational mathematics have included professional and amateur mathematicians:

See also 
 List of recreational number theory topics

References

Further reading 
 W. W. Rouse Ball and H.S.M. Coxeter (1987). Mathematical Recreations and Essays, Thirteenth Edition, Dover. .
 Henry E. Dudeney (1967). 536 Puzzles and Curious Problems. Charles Scribner's sons. .
 Sam Loyd (1959. 2 Vols.). in Martin Gardner: The Mathematical Puzzles of Sam Loyd. Dover. .
 Raymond M. Smullyan (1991). The Lady or the Tiger? And Other Logic Puzzles. Oxford University Press. .

External links

Recreational Mathematics from MathWorld at Wolfram Research
The Unreasonable Utility of Recreational Mathematics by David Singmaster